The Rise of Chaos is the 15th studio album by German heavy metal band Accept, released on 4 August 2017. This is the first Accept album with guitarist Uwe Lulis and drummer Christopher Williams, replacing Herman Frank and Stefan Schwarzmann, respectively. It is also their final studio album to feature bassist Peter Baltes, who left Accept in November 2018. Like their previous three studio albums, The Rise of Chaos was produced by Andy Sneap, making it the band's fourth collaboration with him. Guitarist Wolf Hoffmann has stated that the album's title refers to the human-caused chaos in the world.

Background
About four months after the release of Blind Rage (2014), it was announced that guitarist Herman Frank and drummer Stefan Schwarzmann had parted ways with Accept. They were later replaced by Uwe Lulis and Christopher Williams, respectively.

On 5 June 2015, prior to the band's performance at the South Park festival in Tampere, Finland, bassist Peter Baltes told Kaaos TV that Accept planned to begin work on a new album after the conclusion of the Blind Rage tour. Asked in a July 2015 interview about the band's future, guitarist Wolf Hoffmann replied, "We will continue for a few more weeks, this run of touring, and then we'll take a little break and come back in the fall, but we're pretty much wrapping up the Blind Rage tour at this point; it's the very last phase of this whole cycle. And then the next album will have to be written and to be recorded, and how long that's gonna take and when that's all gonna happen, who knows? But it'll happen; that's all I know." Hoffmann stated that the new album would be released around July or August 2017. Like their previous three albums, the album was produced by Andy Sneap, making it Accept's fourth collaboration with him. On 16 April 2017 Accept announced that the album, titled The Rise of Chaos, would be released on 4 August. On 2 June the band released title track single digitally via Nuclear Blast accompanied by new artwork.

Critical reception

The Rise of Chaos has received generally positive reviews from critics. AllMusic writer James Christopher Monger gave the album a rating of three-and-a-half stars out of five, and wrote, "Internationally, Accept's particular brand of workmanlike metal, a steely mix of muscular AC/DC-styled riffage and Motörhead-esque bad attitude, never truly went out of style, and The Rise of Chaos plays to those strengths via a ten-track onslaught that shows little in the way of innovation, yet never loses sight of the end goal, which is to rock with extreme prejudice."

The album was honored with a 2017 Metal Storm Award for Best Heavy Metal/Melodic Album. It was also nominated for a German Metal Hammer Award for Best Album in 2018, but lost to Powerwolf's The Sacrament of Sin.

Track listing
All songs written by Mark Tornillo, Wolf Hoffmann and Peter Baltes.

Personnel
 Mark Tornillo – vocals
 Wolf Hoffmann – guitars
 Uwe Lulis – guitars
 Peter Baltes – bass
 Christopher Williams – drums

Charts

References

2017 albums
Accept (band) albums
Nuclear Blast albums